Christoffer Semelius (aka. Christoffer Lauridsen) (born 1 August 1986) is a Danish-Swedish songwriter and producer working out of Stockholm. He has produced/co-written and collaborated with and for artists such as Red Velvet, K-pop superstars GoT7, Wanna One, Martina Stoessel, and Chord Overstreet.

Early in his career Christoffer moved to the United Kingdom where he worked as an assistant engineer in a recording studio. Shortly after his time in the UK Christoffer was hired to work in one of Copenhagen's prime recording facilities to engineer jazz and classical recordings. Christoffer studied music production in Växjö, Sweden, and afterwards moved to Stockholm where he worked as a producer/songwriter in collaboration with Anders Bagge, Stefan Örn and Johan Kronlund for several years.

Christoffer is a multi-platinum certified songwriter who has co-written/produced songs for/with several international writers/artists and has contributed to several international Billboard charts and won "Song of the year" with Umpah Umpah. He has also done work for Eurovision Song Contest and collaborated with Jay-Z early in his career.

"Losing the Love"(produced and co-written by Christoffer) is featured in the Disney movie titled Tini: El gran cambio de Violetta starring Martina Stoessel, as well as on her debut album. When released on April 29 the album went Gold in Argentina and topped the charts in several countries.

Songwriting/producer discography

References

1986 births
Living people
Danish songwriters
Danish record producers